Quercus wutaishanica, the Liaoning oak, is a species of oak native to Mongolia, China, and possibly Korea. It is the dominant species in the forest of the Loess Plateau. It is placed in section Quercus.

References

wutaishanica
Plants described in 1906